Abrantes is a municipality in the central Médio Tejo subregion of Portugal. The municipality includes several parishes divided by the Tagus River, which runs through the middle of the municipality. The urbanized part, the parish of Abrantes (São Vicente e São João) e Alferrarede, located on the north bank of the Tagus, has about 17,000 residents.

History

The Celts are believed to have established the first settlement in Abrantes around 300 BC. The name is derived from Latin Aurantes, perhaps referring to deposits of alluvial gold (Latin: aurum) along the Tagus. Similarly, Roman mosaics, coins, the remains of ancient aqueducts, as well as other antiquities, have been discovered in the vicinity of Abrantes.

The village of Abrantes and the Abrantes Castle were conquered from the Moors by Afonso I of Portugal in 1148. After 1172, Abrantes was a military outpost, under the dominion of the Order of Saint James of Compostela. In 1173, the region, including its castle, were donated to the Order of Saint James of the Sword, a distinct order. Pope Nicholas IV (around 1290) released this Order from the jurisdiction of the Castilian grand master of Santiago de Compostela Order in Uclés. It received its municipal foral in 1179, in compensation for its resistance against the Moroccan Abem Jacob. Its creation in 1179, was based on the concelhos perfeitos ("perfect municipality") model; they were formed on the specific day that settlers were invited to populate them; the administrative regime, the organization of the municipal authority and geographic distribution were planned as part of system of populating uninhabited lands, and extending the political influence of the Kingdom. Its geography contributed to the colonization:

On 24 April 1281, King Dinis of Portugal, conceded the ownership of Abrantes to Queen Elizabeth of Portugal.

Afonso IV of Portugal transferred the title of the religious parish to the Knights Hospitaller, in 1327, and granted Abrantes to Leonor Teles. Partners of the Master of Avis, the Abrantinos were one of the first to support the Lisboete movement of 1383, among them Fernando Álvares de Almeida, protector of the Casa de Abrantes.

King Manuel stayed in Abrantes for a long period; by 1510 he conceded a new foral to the town; and his children, the Infantes Fernando and Luís were born in Abrantes. During the 16th century, Abrantes and its religious parish was one of the largest and more populous lands in the Kingdom, with 3,436 inhabitants, four convents and 13 chapels or churches within its frontiers.

In 1581, in his move to Tomar, Philip I of Portugal stopped in Abrantes for several days, and during his reign was responsible for the reconstruction of Abrantes' municipal buildings.
It was the seat of Portuguese marquesses, one of which was an early patron of the Brazilian-born versatile scientist, naturalist and pioneering inventor-aeronaut Bartholomeu Lourenço de Gusmão.

During 1640, Abrantes was one of the first lands to declare their support for John IV of Portugal. From the 17th and 18th centuries onwards, its ancient military importance was confirmed, as it was used by Portuguese and foreign armies to garrison or concentrate their forces. The village of Abrantes was captured on 24 November 1807 by French general Jean-Andoche Junot, who was awarded a ducal title for his victory by Napoleon I in 1808, and used as base for further marshaling of French forces. In the Convention of Cintra (22 August 1808) the town was returned to the Portuguese.

During the reign of Joseph I (1750–1777) the village became the center of the silk industry, which prospered until 1800, designated the Academia Tubuciana.

In 1820, Abrantes supported the Liberal Revolution and celebrated the 1822 Constitution; although Miguel of Portugal did find many supporters in the municipality, no outright manifestation of support occurred in light of the Vilafrancada. In November 1862, the Santerém-Abrantes lines was opened, and by March 1868, a bridge between Abrantes and Rossio to the southern Tagus region was well underway.

An active republican center, Abrantes was the place of preparatory meetings for the 5 October 1910 Revolution, which may have contributed to the village's elevation to the status of city on 14 June 1916.

Geography

Physical geography

Abrantes lies in a central enclave within the Portuguese territory and a transition zone between the Ribatejo, Beira Baixa and Alto Alentejo. This location allowed development of a diversified culture, influenced by many cultures around it; Sardoal and Vila de Rei, to the north; Mação and Gavião, to the east; Ponte de Sôr and Chamusca, in the south; and Constância and Tomar in the west. Abrantes is also located along many important road and rail links throughout the country, including the Madrid-Badajoz-Lisbon railway, being at the junction with the Guarda-Abrantes line, and the Lisbon-Porto access (the A23 and Beira Baixa roadways).

Abrantes commands the highway along the Tagus valley west from Belver (in the municipality of Gavião) until Constância, occupying the crest of a hill covered with olive woods, gardens and vines; historically, the fortified town has been regarded as an important military position.

The municipality is also center of two major hydrological resources: the Tagus River, which cross the territory for 30 kilometers and the Albufeira from Castelo do Bode.

Climate
Abrantes has a Mediterranean climate with hot, dry summers and mild, wet winters.

Human geography
Administratively, the municipality is divided into 13 civil parishes, responsible for local area development and administration of services:

 Abrantes (São Vicente e São João) e Alferrarede
 Aldeia do Mato e Souto
 Alvega e Concavada
 Bemposta
 Carvalhal
 Fontes
 Martinchel
 Mouriscas
 Pego
 Rio de Moinhos
 São Facundo e Vale das Mós
 São Miguel do Rio Torto e Rossio ao Sul do Tejo
 Tramagal

It has grown dramatically since the early 20th century: from a base population of 7,255 in 1900, it had more than 41,000 inhabitants in 2001.

Notable people 

 Jorge de Lencastre, Duke of Coimbra (1481–1550) a prince, illegitimate son of King John II of Portugal
 Luís of Portugal, Duke of Beja (1506–1555) the second son of King Manuel I of Portugal
 Ferdinand of Portugal, Duke of Guarda 1507–1534) a prince, the son of King Manuel I of Portugal 
 António Leal Moreira (1758–1819) a Portuguese classical composer and organist
 Joaquim Marques Esparteiro (1895–1976) a Portuguese navy officer and colonial administrator
 Maria de Lourdes Pintasilgo (1930–2004) a chemical engineer and politician; the first and to date the only woman Prime Minister of Portugal

Sport 
 Luís Mena e Silva (1902–1963) a Portuguese horse rider; bronze medallist at the 1936 & 1948 Summer Olympics
 Hélder Catalão (born 1955) a former footballer with 335 club caps

References

Notes

Sources
 
 

Heraldica.org- Napoleonic victory titles

External links

 Photos from Abrantes

 
Populated places in Santarém District
Burial sites of the House of Aviz
Municipalities of Santarém District
Populated places established in the 1st millennium BC